NGC 1428 is an elliptical galaxy in the constellation Fornax, 75 million light years from Earth. It is a member of the Fornax Cluster. Its diameter is 24,000 light years.

It was discovered by Johann Friedrich Julius Schmidt on January 19, 1865.

See also 
NGC 1399
NGC 1316
NGC 1317
NGC 1365
NGC 1350
NGC 1427A
NGC 1427
IC 1993
IC 2006

References 

Elliptical galaxies
Fornax (constellation)
Fornax Cluster
1428
013611